Wolfango Montanari (16 May 1931 – 23 February 2021) was an Italian sprinter.

Biography
He won five medals at the International athletics competitions, two of these with national relays team. He competed in the 1952 Summer Olympics, he has 14 caps in national team from 1951 to 1957.

Achievements

See also
 Italy national relay team
 Italy at the 1951 Mediterranean Games
 Italy at the 1955 Mediterranean Games

References

External links
 

1931 births
2021 deaths
Italian male sprinters
Olympic athletes of Italy
Athletes (track and field) at the 1952 Summer Olympics
Mediterranean Games gold medalists for Italy
Mediterranean Games bronze medalists for Italy
Athletes (track and field) at the 1951 Mediterranean Games
Athletes (track and field) at the 1955 Mediterranean Games
Mediterranean Games medalists in athletics
Italian Athletics Championships winners
20th-century Italian people
21st-century Italian people